Louis Bell (December 5, 1864 to June 14, 1923) was an American engineer, physicist, inventor, and academic. He was an early pioneer in illumination engineering and the transmission of electricity, being awarded 25 patents in power transmission.

Biography
Louis Bell was born December 5, 1864, in the small village of Chester, New Hampshire, the youngest child of Louis Bell (Sr.) and Mary Anne (Mollie) Persis Bouton. His father was a New Hampshire lawyer who died in 1865 while serving as a Union Army colonel at the battle of Fort Fisher during the American Civil War. His mother died shortly thereafter, leaving Louis Bell and his older sister Marion to be raised by their grandmother, Lucy G. Bell née Smith, the widow of prominent New Hampshire politician Samuel Bell.

An intelligent boy, Bell was an avid reader, and his studies were encouraged by his grandmother. At the age of ten he attended the nearby Northwood Academy. Two years later, Bell was sent to be educated at Phillips Exeter Academy, and he matriculated to Dartmouth College in 1880. There he studied physics and chemistry, among other subjects, while taking an interest in astronomy. He graduated with an A.B. in 1884, after winning final honors in physics, honorable mention in English, and serving as associate editor of the The Dartmouth.

After remaining a year at Dartmouth as a post-graduate, he spent three years in residence at Johns Hopkins University studying physics and chemistry under Henry A. Rowland. Bell was awarded a Ph.D. in 1888 with a thesis titled On the Absolute Wave-length of Light. He next joined the staff of Purdue University as a professor seated in the newly-established chair of applied electricity. While there he organized the instruction as head of the newly-founded school of electrical engineering. Resigning at the end of the year, he joined the consulting firm of Bliss and Bell. In 1890, he became editor of Electrical World, a weekly journal owned by the W. J. Johnston company. Bell would maintain a literary connection with the publication for the remainder of this life.

In 1892, he was hired as chief engineer for the power transmission department of the General Electric company. Bell would design some of the nation's first polyphase power transmission plants. The same year, he published The Electric Railway in collaboration with Oscar T. Crosby. During 1893, he supervised the installation of the nation's first three-phase generators at the Redlands Power Plant in Mill Creek, California. He went on to work on the Folsom Powerhouse, which became the most powerful in the world at that time. Using a system Bell designed, this generator transmitted a now-standard 60 Hz frequency alternating current over long-distance lines,  to Sacramento in 1895. It was the first facility in the nation to do this.

He married Sarah Gross Hemenway in 1893. Sarah was a Dartmouth alumni from the class of 1884. They would have one son, Louis Hemenway Bell.

Bell became a Boston engineering consultant in 1895, and he remained in this job for the rest of his life. Initially his focus was on power transmission, but later he specialized in the engineering of illumination. He lectured at both Harvard and the Massachusetts Institute of Technology. In 1897, he authored Electric Power Transmission, which became a standard textbook on the subject for several years. During the Spanish–American War (1898), Bell served as a technical officer in the Volunteer Electrical Corps.

His Art of Illumination was published in 1902 and became a standard work on the topic. He contributed articles on electric power transmission and electric motors to the 10th and 11th editions of Encyclopædia Britannica. In 1908, Bell served as the third president of the Illuminating Engineering Society. During World War I, he was a member of the advisory committee for the Council of National Defense. For a period of ten years he served as vice president of the Illuminating Engineering Society of Great Britain. During the early days of the automobile, he worked on headlights and the development of headlight lenses.

Bell retained an interest in astronomy for much of his life, and in 1922 he authored The Telescope. He was known to be a good shot and had a life-long love of the outdoors. He died June 14, 1923. An honorary Doctorate of Science was awarded to him by Dartmouth College shortly after his death.

Bibliography

</ref>

References

1864 births
1923 deaths
American academics
American electrical engineers
Phillips Exeter Academy alumni
Dartmouth College alumni
Johns Hopkins University alumni
Purdue University faculty
General Electric employees
People from Chester, New Hampshire